Matthew Stokoe (born in 1963) is a British writer and screenwriter.

Biography
Stokoe was born in England, graduated from University of East London where he studied economics, and has lived in Australia, New Zealand, and the US (Santa Monica, CA). Stokoe has written several books and film scenarios and also co-wrote the internet comic Flick and Jube. He is mostly known for his brutal, noir, violent style of writing. Among his favorite authors are Raymond Chandler, Hubert Selby, and Nelson Algren.

Bibliography

Novels
Colony of Whores (2014)
Empty Mile (2010)
High Life (2002)
Cows (1998)

Scenarios for movies
 Rock dir. Brian Challis
 Dog dir. Paul Kwiatkowski

References

External links
Official website
A necrophile hero is something to be
London Book Review of High Life
Publishers Weekly starred review of "Empty Mile"
Believer review of "High Life"

British writers
Living people
1963 births